From the Desk Of... Mr. Lady is an EP by American feminist electroclash trio Le Tigre.

In popular culture 
In 2016, "Mediocrity Rules" was featured in a commercial for Post Foods' Fruity and Cocoa Pebbles.

Track listing

References

EPs by American artists
2001 debut EPs